Patrick Russel (16 October 1857 – 12 October 1917) was a Scottish first-class cricketer and tea merchant.

The son of Alexander Russel of The Scotsman, he was born at Edinburgh in October 1857. He was educated at both the Edinburgh Academy and Fettes College. After completing his education, Russel worked largely in British India as a tea planter and merchant. He was a keen cricketer who played club cricket for the West of Scotland Cricket Club and Grange Cricket Club, in addition to playing minor matches for Scotland in 1878. Russel appeared once in first-class cricket for the Marylebone Cricket Club (MCC), captaining the club against Derbyshire at Lord's in 1894. Batting twice in the match, he was dismissed in the MCC first innings without scoring by George Davidson, while in their second innings following-on, he was unbeaten on 25, with Derbyshire going onto win the match by 7 wickets. He died on 12 October 1917 from heart failure, immediately following a meeting of the Imperial Tea Company of which he was a director. His brother, John, also played first-class cricket.

References

External links

1857 births
1917 deaths
Cricketers from Edinburgh
People educated at Edinburgh Academy
People educated at Fettes College
Scottish merchants
English cricketers
Marylebone Cricket Club cricketers
20th-century Scottish businesspeople